The following is a list of transfers for the 2021 Major League Soccer (MLS) season that have been made during the 2020–21 MLS offseason all the way through to the roster freeze.

Transfers

References 

2021

Major League Soccer
Major League Soccer